Bharya ( 'Wife') was an Indian Malayalam-language television thriller series that which launched 16 May 2016 on Asianet from Monday to Friday 10:00 PM, later shifter to 9:00 PM and later shifted to evening slot of 6:30 PM. Mridula Vijay, Sajan Surya, Arun G Raghavan, Rajesh Hebbar, Ronson Vincent, Alina Padikkal and  Keerthana Podhuval plays the lead roles of the series.

The show aired its climax a one hour mega episode on 26 and 27 April 2019 completing 860 episode.

The show is remade into Telugu as under the same name and is being broadcast on Star Maa. 
In 2019, it is remade into Kannada as Marali Bandalu Seethe on Star Suvarna. Officially Tamil Remake Coming Soon Star Vijay.

Plot
Bharya tells the story of a family residing in Vrindavanam. Nandan and Rohini are the children of Professor, Vishwanatha Menon and Jayaprabha Teacher. They lead a life with little contact to the outside world.

Although Rohini was previously married to Vrindavanam resident, Sharath, she was later widowed.  However, even after more than 4 years, she is unable to acknowledge this. Having moved back to her parents' home with her daughter, Rohini continues to believe that Sharath will return. Nandan - without his parents' permission - marries his love interest, Nayana, and takes her to Vrindavanam. His family does not know that Nayana and her family are a band of antisocials who serve as human parasites.

Nayana's brother Narendran is also their town's  rowdy, but  people from Vrindavanam seems to have no idea about it. Narendran lusts after Rohini and Nayana starts to work her cruel and devilish activities. Initially shocked, but the family accepts identity of their daughter in law after a long period, but Nandan did not and is blinded by Nayana's feminine charms. Rohini marries Jose for protection from Narendran. Will Nayana's family be successful in their cunning and destructive tactics is what the story explores.

The teledrama is a daily bit for vicarious traumatization of ill family styles and instructive aid on such ways. Rakhi (Rohini and Nadan's younger sister) died by hanging herself because of Jose (that is what they think) but it was actually because of Sharath the villain. Sharath's true nature is exposed to everyone. Meanwhile, Nayana who re-entered the Vrindavan house as she was pregnant, was hated by everyone in the house. She delivers a baby girl, who the Vrindavan family refuses to accept as their own. However, Rohini visits the baby in the hospital. Finally it is revealed that person is there in the name of Sharath is not Rohini's husbent real sharath. But he is Suresh aka Vidura Sura. An evil womanizer and wanted criminal. Who is the look alike of Sharath. When Rohini gave birth to her child, Sharath was coming to meet them but he was beaten and  thrown to a rail way track because he looks identical to the criminal. They thought he was Vidura Sura. In that same time Vidura met Sharath and seeing his resemblance to him. He took Sharath's identity and pretended to be Sharath to everyone. Finally, the real Sharath came back and Vidura Sura was killed by Rohini. Now Sharath is being hunted by people mistaking his identity as the deceased criminal. Naran marries Mochitha and she became pregnant. Naran knows about Sharath shares Momochitha.

Now the main lead characters changes to Sharath (Arun G Raghavan) and Rohini (Mridula Vijay). It has now come to knowledge that Rohini's original husband Sharath is alive. Jose (Rajesh Hebbar) compels Naran to disturb Sharath in any way so as to make Rohini his own. in the end, Jose gives Rohini to Sharath.

Cast

Main cast
 Sonu Satheesh Kumar / Mridula Vijay as Rohini Sharath
 Sajan Surya as Narendran or Naran/Vakathi Naran
 Arun G Raghavan as (dual role) Sarath and Vithura Sura/ Suresh/ Surya/ Shahjahan/ Shankar Das/ Krishnaprasad/ Arjun/ Shakthi/ Yamini(dead)
 Ronson Vincent / Ashwanth Thilak as Nandan
 Rajesh Hebbar as Jose
Alina Padikkal as Nayana Nandan (female antagonist)

Recurring cast
 Aishwarya Mithun Koroth / Keerthana Podhuval as CI Moujitha Naran
 Souparnika Subhash as Leena Teacher
 Sunitha / Lintu Rony as Rahana
 E A Rajendran  as Jaganathan / Jaggu / Jagan, Naran and Nayana's father
 Devi Chandana as Durga: Naran and Nayana's mother
 Yuvarani as Jayaprabha Teacher: Mother of Rohini, Nandan, Rakhi
 Ilavarasan as Prof. Vishwanathan: Father of Rohini, Nandan, Rakhi 
 Akhil Anand as Onthu Kuttan: Naren's friend and Nandan's assistant
 Baby Keziya / Baby Krishna Priya as Lechu, Sharath and Rohini's daughter
 Sethu Lakshmi as Ammachi, Jose's mother 
 Vijayakumari as Moothumma, Rahana's grandmother
 Shobi Thilakan as SI Balaraman
 Harisree Martin as Puthur Dinakaran/ Duplicate Bapa/ Beeran/ Sharavanan
 Vijayan Karanthoor as Hajiar, Rahana's father
 Jennifer Antony as Gandhari Amma
 Dominic Chittat as Captain 
 Hari as Ajayan: Nandan's family friend & advisor
 Rajkumar as DySP Mathews
 Sreekala as Sarath's mother
 Asritha Kingini as Kaveri, Gandhari Amma's daughter
 Sidharaj as Narayana Gowda
 Jayaprakash as Iyyer, Gandhari Amma's manager
 Azeez Nedumangadu as Shivaprasad, director of Nayana's serial
 Kulappulli Leela as Nayana's Grandmother
 KPAC Leelamani as Chechi
 Akshara S.P./Blessy Kurien as Rakhi(dead) 
 Bondhu Aneesh as Ayisha: Rahana's mother
 Jose Peroorkada as Kurukan Saji: Naren's old assistant
 Haridas Varkala as Thankappan
 Ashraf Pezhumoodu as serial producer
 Mukesh M Nair as Tamil serial producer
 Niyaz Khan as Neeraj, Rakhi's fiancé
 Amboori Jayan as Sahadevan(dead)
 Sarath Swamy as Manuel(dead)
 Sumi Rashik as Pavithra
 Bindu Murali as Valyammachi
Mohan Raj as Keerikkadan Jose (cameo)
 Vanchiyoor Praveen Kumar as Brocker
 Jismy
 Harijith Alangad
 Yuva Krishna as Journalist (cameo)
 Dayanna Hameed as News reader (cameo)
 Arya Rohit as Gowda's daughter (only photo footage)

Awards and nominations

Asianet Television Awards 2017 
 Best Actor - Saajan Surya
 Most Popular Actress - Alina Padikkal
 Best Actress New face Female - Aishwarya Mithun
 Youth Icon - Ronson Vincent

Asianet Television Awards 2018
 Popular Serial -Bharya
 Best Actor - Saajan Surya
 Best Actor in a Negative Role - Arun G Raghavan
 Best Actor in a Comic role - Harisree Martin

References 

2016 Indian television series debuts
Malayalam-language television shows
Asianet (TV channel) original programming